The Danish Union of Metalworkers (Metal) is a trade union in Denmark.  It principally represents workers in the metal industries, but also covers telecommunications, transportation and some other sectors.

The union was founded in 1888, as the Danish Blacksmith and Machine Workers' Association.  It became the "Danish Union of Metalworkers" in 1972.

Over the years, numerous smaller unions have merged in to the Metalworkers' union. These include:

 1957: Semi-Skilled Metal Workers' Union
 1967: Danish Metal Printers' Union
 1968: Metal Workers' Union of Denmark
 1969: Danish Coppersmiths' Union
 1970: Danish Foundry Workers' Union
 1972: Danish Boilermakers' Union
 1976: Danish Vehicle Builders' Union
 1976: Danish Ship Builders', Riggers' and Sailmakers' Union
 1981: Danish Metal Grinders' Union
 1984: Gold and Silver Workers' Union of Denmark
 2003: Telecommunications Union
 2011: Danish Ship Caterers' Union

The union was long affiliated to the Danish Confederation of Trade Unions (LO), and for many years was its third-largest affiliate.  Following LO's merger, in 2019, it is now affiliated to it successor, the Danish Trade Union Confederation (FH).  It has also been affiliated to the European Metalworkers' Federation and the International Metalworkers' Federation, now part of the IndustriALL Global Union.

Presidents
1888: Valdemar Olsen
1890: Ferdinand Hurop
1892: H. P. Hansen
1899: Jacob Anton Hansen
1926: Johannes Kjærbøl
1935: Peter Anders Andersen
1944: Hans Rasmussen
1972: Paulus Andersen
1978: Georg Poulsen
1991: Max Bæhring
2003: Thorkild E. Jensen
2012: Claus Jensen

References

External links

European Metalworkers' Federation
International Metalworkers' Federation
Danish Confederation of Trade Unions
Metal trade unions
Trade unions in Denmark
Trade unions established in 1888
Labour movement in Denmark